Donald Weiss (January 22, 1947 – May 22, 2010) was a Canadian football player who played for the Winnipeg Blue Bombers and Saskatchewan Roughriders. He played college football at Juniata College. He was inducted into their athletic hall of fame in 1999. He died in 2010.

References

External links
Just Sports Stats

1947 births
2010 deaths
American football quarterbacks
Canadian football quarterbacks
American players of Canadian football
Juniata Eagles football players
Winnipeg Blue Bombers players
Players of American football from Pennsylvania
People from Hazleton, Pennsylvania